Franz-Josef Wuermeling (8 November 1900 - 7 March 1986) was a West German CDU politician and minister who served as Federal Minister for Family Affairs from 1953 to 1962.

Early life and education
Wuermeling was born in Charlottenburg, Berlin in 1900. His father, Bernhard, worked at the Reichsamt des Innern and the Reichsarbeitsamt, the Ministry of the Interior and the Ministry of Labour in the German Empire. Wuermeling attended school in Berlin and studied law and economics at Münster University, Hamburg University and Freiburg University. He served in the German Navy in the First World War.

Political career
Wuermeling was the mayor of Linz for a year in 1945 before being elected to the Rhineland Landtag (Parliament) where he served as a Secretary in the State Ministry of the Interior from 1947 to 1949. In the 1949 German federal election, Wuermeling was elected to the West German Bundestag.

Adenauer cabinet

After the 1953 election, Wuermeling was appointed the first Federal Minister for Family Affairs. Wuermeling would stay in the post through Adenauer's second, third and fourth ministries until December 1962.

He introduced the so-called "Wuermeling pass" which enabled families with children to travel at a discounted price.

Honours
Wuermeling received the following honours:

National orders
 Commander's Cross of the Order of Merit of the Federal Republic of Germany

International orders
 Grand Officer of the Legion of Honour
 Grand Cross of the Order of Saint Gregory the Great

See also

Konrad Adenauer

References

1900 births
1986 deaths
Christian Democratic Union of Germany politicians
People from Charlottenburg
University of Münster alumni
Mayors of places in Rhineland-Palatinate
Grand Crosses 1st class of the Order of Merit of the Federal Republic of Germany
Members of the Bundestag for Rhineland-Palatinate
Members of the Bundestag 1949–1953
Heads of the German Chancellery